Bijapur District may refer to:
 Bijapur district, Karnataka
 Bijapur district, Chhattisgarh

District name disambiguation pages